is a company that operates a chain of supermarkets in Japan. The company operates in Aichi, Mie, and Gifu. The company is headquartered in Ichinomiya, Aichi, and is a member of the CGC Japan.

History

Early history

In 1940 there were more than 20 employees.

1950s and 1960s

In 1960, Cash registers and in May, 1962, Self service were introduced.

In 1967 the company became chain store, there were 2 stores with total sales of JPY 1.2 billion.

1970s and 1980s

In 1982, there were 8 stores with total sales of over JPY 10 billion. the company introduced current Advertising slogan  and current Corporate identity.

1990s-present
In 1992, the company opened its first stores outside of Aichi in Inabe District, Mie. it entered Ōno, Gifu in 1993, there were 17 stores with 1,300 employees and total sales of JPY 26.5 billion.

In October, 2000,  became CEO of the company. The company began to online retailer   in 2000.

In March, 2001 The company were 20 stores with 1,600 employees and total sales of JPY 28.0 billion. On September 9, 2003, first Natural food store  opened in Aichi Prefecture.

On November 22, 2007, the company obtained certification ISO9001.

Subsidiaries

Kanesue
 business model is based on selling a wide variety of food merchandise at "."

Earth One

 is online retailer  this retail formats began in 2000.

Earth one's sales were JPY 500 million.

Shunrakuzen
 is natural food store.

The first Shunrakuzen store opened on September 9, 2003, in Aichi Prefecture. As of March 1, 2008, there were 2 of them in Japan.

Gallery

See also
 List of supermarket chains in Asia
 List of Japanese companies
 CGC Japan

References and notes
General reference

 Japanese book 『商い。百年 坊、魚食いたかないか？株式会社カネスエ 創業百年記念史』

External links

 Kanesue
 Shunrakuzen
 Earth One
 C.G.C.JAPAN
C.G.C.JAPAN 

1951 establishments in Japan
Supermarkets of Japan
Retail companies established in 1951
Companies based in Aichi Prefecture